Breast Cancer Research is a defunct cancer charity that was based in Paisley and Glasgow, Scotland. It had its assets frozen in 2003 after a probe found that only £1.5m of the £13m it had raised was donated to charity. The group's fundraiser, Tony Freeman, of Glasgow, was paid about 60 per cent - some £8 million - of the charity's cash in commission. Several organizers as well as the fundraiser were barred from running charities in the UK. Solutions RMC was employed to fundraise for Breast Cancer Research charity and accused of taking too large a share of donations.

Its registered charity number was SC024834.  As at 2008, the Office of the Scottish Charity Regulator record states that the charity's status is "Judicial factor appointed" and that the register "currently hold no contact details for this charity".

See also 

Moonbeams, a cancer children's charity also hit by scandal

References

Charities based in Scotland
Defunct organisations based in Scotland
2003 disestablishments in Scotland
Health charities in Scotland
Scandals in Scotland
Organizations disestablished in 2003
Charities based in Glasgow
Former cancer organisations based in the United Kingdom
History of science and technology in Scotland
Medical and health organisations based in Scotland
Charity scandals